Resideo Technologies, Inc. is a publicly traded U.S.-based company formed in 2018 out of a spin off from Honeywell. It provides room air temperature, quality, and humidity control and security systems primarily in residential dwellings in the U.S. and internationally. The company operates in two segments: products and solutions and global distribution. It manufactures and distributes smart-home and software products, including temperature and lighting control, security, and water and air monitoring. The company also distributes security, fire and low-voltage products.

History

Spin-off
Honeywell spun off the Homes and Distribution business in October 2018 as part of a corporate restructuring program. The new company was named Resideo. Shares in the company began trading on the New York Stock Exchange under the ticker symbol REZI.
Roger Fradin, a former vice chairman of Honeywell, was named board chair. Mike Nefkens was named president and CEO. The company established its headquarters in Austin, Texas following the spin-off.
Resideo’s shares initially traded at $28 with market capitalization of $3.2 billion. In its first full quarter as a standalone company, the company reported sales of $1.2 billion and earnings of $2.53 per share. In the second quarter of 2019, the company reported sales of $1.2 billion and earnings of $0.19 per share.

In 2021, Resideo announced that it would move its corporate headquarters from Austin, Texas to Scottsdale, Arizona. The move was complete by early 2022.

Mergers and acquisitions
On March 28, 2019, Resideo announced the acquisition of Buoy Labs, a company that offers water usage and leak prevention products. 
On May 21, 2019, Resideo announced it had acquired energy efficiency technology from Whisker Labs. The technology creates an thermodynamic model of a home to predict energy use and enable efficiency.
On June 27, 2019, Resideo announced the acquisition of LifeWhere, a company that uses predictive analytics to forecast home appliance failures.

On February 7, 2022, Resideo announced it would acquire First Alert from Newell Brands.

Business units

Products and solutions
Resideo sells products under the Honeywell Home brand through a long-term licensing agreement. Products include security cameras, heating controls, water leak and freeze detectors, and thermostats and controls.

Distribution
Resideo owns ADI Global Distribution, a wholesale distributor of security products. Along with the Homes unit, ADI Global was spun off from Honeywell as part of the restructuring that became Resideo.

References

External links
 

American companies established in 2018
Companies based in Scottsdale, Arizona
Companies listed on the New York Stock Exchange
Corporate spin-offs